Herb Howdle (born February 7, 1949) is a Canadian former professional ice hockey defenceman. He was selected by the Calgary Broncos in the late rounds of the 1972 WHA General Player Draft.

Awards and honours

References

External links

1949 births
Living people
Boston Braves (AHL) players
Calgary Broncos draft picks
Canadian ice hockey defencemen
Dayton Gems players
Fort Wayne Komets players
Oklahoma City Blazers (1965–1977) players
Canadian expatriate ice hockey players in the United States